Labeobarbus varicostoma is a species of ray-finned fish in the genus Labeobarbus is endemic to the Lucalla River in Angola.

References 

varicostoma
Taxa named by George Albert Boulenger
Fish described in 1910